The 9th Army Corps  was a large military formation of the French Army, constituted during the Second French Empire, and during the First and the Second World War.

History

First World War 
At the mobilisation, the 9e Army Corps was constituted near Tours as a subunit of the Second Army. The 9e Corps comprised two infantry divisions, the 17th and 52nd, and the Division Marocaine, a colonial infantry division.

Second World War 
In early September 1939, the 9e Corps was re-created in Tours, under general Émile Laure, from elements of the 9th military region. It was a part of the Fourth Army, under General Edouard Réquin, itself a part of the French 2nd Army Group which charged with the defence of the Maginot Line.

Battle of France 
From late 1939 to May 1940, the 9e Corps was deployed around the Saint-Avold - Faulquemont sector, in Moselle, with the general staff in Landroff. Two infantry divisions defended the fortified sector.

By late May, the Germans had pierced in the Ardennes and, with the military situation degrading, front units on the Maginot Line were gradually brought back and sent on the front on the Somme river. On 22 May, General Marcel Ihler took command of the Corps. On 27 May, the Corps marched towards Sarcus, and then to Lyons-la-Forêt, in Normandie, along with general Altmayer's 10ème Armée. Attempts at organised defence were bypassed by the Germans and these units were forced to fall back.

The remnants of the 9e Corps were eventually surrounded in Saint-Valéry-en-Caux and surrendered on 12 June 1940. Most of the soldiers were kept in captivity in Germany until 1945.

Commanders 
 1870 : général Cousin-Montauban
 1873 : général de Cissey
 1874 : général du Barail
 1879 : général Galliffet
 .
 20 January 1912 : général Dubail
 29 April 1913 : général Dubois
 13 March 1915 : général Curé
 14 May 1916 : général Pentel
 29 October 1916 : général Niessel
 22 August 1917 : général Hirschauer 
 17 December 1917 : général Mangin
 6 June 1918 : général Garnier-Duplessis
 .
 2 September 1939 : général Laure
 21 May - 12 June 1940 : général Ihler

Sources and references 

009
009
009